Canada competed at the 2018 Summer Youth Olympics, in Buenos Aires, Argentina from October 6th to 18th. 

The Canadian team consisted of 71 athletes competing in 20 sports and was officially named on September 25, 2018. It was announced on October 4, 2018, that Canada received an additional reallocated spot in boxing, meaning the total team size was 72 athletes (33 men and 39 women).

On October 3, 2018, trampolinist Jérémy Chartier was named as the flag bearer during the opening ceremony.

All nations can qualify only a maximum of one team sport per gender and Canada chose men's field hockey and women's rugby sevens.

Competitors
The following is the list of number of competitors participating at the Games per sport/discipline.

Medallists
Medals awarded to participants of mixed-NOC (combined) teams are represented in italics. These medals are not counted towards the individual NOC medal tally.

|  style="text-align:left; vertical-align:top;"|

| width="22%" align="left" valign="top" |

Archery

Canada qualified one boy.

Individual

Team

Athletics (track and field)

Canada qualified 15 athletes (five boys and ten girls). This marks Canada's largest track and field team at the Youth Olympics.

Boys
Evan Burke – 3000 m
Adam Exley – 110 m hurdles
Joakim Généreux – 200 m
Lucas Woodhall – Shot put
Skyler York – 2000 m steeplechase

Girls
Mérédith Boyer – 2000 m steeplechase
Dolly Gabri – Discus 
Olivia Gee – 100 m hurdles 
Kendra Lewis – 1500 m
Julia Lovsin – 400 m hurdles
Jasneet Nijjar – 400 m
Donna Ntambue – 100 m
Cameron Ormond – 3000 m
Princess Roberts – 200 m
Alexzandra Throndson – Pole vault

Badminton

Canada qualified one boy based on the Badminton Junior World Rankings.

Boy

Team

Beach volleyball

Canada received a reallocated spot to enter a girls team of two athletes.

Girls

Boxing

Canada received a reallocated spot to enter a boy. Canada later received another reallocated spot to send an additional male athlete.

Boys

Dancesport

Canada qualified two dancers based on its performance at the 2018 World Youth Breaking Championship.

Individual

Diving

Fencing

Canada qualified three fencers (one male and two female).

Individual

Team

Field hockey

Canada qualified a boys' team of nine athletes after a bronze medal finish at the Pan American qualification event in Guadalajara, Mexico in March 2018. The team was officially named on September 12, 2018.

Boys' Tournament

Roster

Amraaz Dhillon
Arjun Hothi
Brendan Guraliuk
Ethan McTavish
Ganga Singh
Isaac Farion
Joshua Kuempel
Rowan Childs
Shazab Butt

Pool B

9th place match

Golf

Canada qualified one boy and one girl.

Individual

Team

Gymnastics

Canada qualified four gymnasts (two boys and two girls). The team was officially named on August 31, 2018.

Artistic
Canada qualified two gymnasts based on its performance at the 2018 American Junior Championship.

Boys'
Individual Qualification

Individual Finals

Girls
Individual Qualification

Individual Finals

Rhythmic
Canada qualified one gymnast based on its performance at the 2018 American Junior Championship.

 Girls' rhythmic individual all-around - 1 quota (Natalie Garcia)

Trampoline
Canada qualified one gymnasts based on its performance at the 2018 American Junior Championship.

 Boys' trampoline - 1 quota (Jérémy Chartier)

Judo

Canada qualified the maximum team size of one boy and one girl. Both athletes have to compete in one weight category higher as their weight category is not represented in the Youth Olympics.

Individual

Team

Rowing

Canada qualified one girls in the women's single sculls after being ranked in the top 8 (among eligible nations) at the 2017 World Championships in Trakai, Lithuania. The rower representing Canada was officially announced on September 10, 2018.

Girls
Single sculls - 1 quota (Grace VandenBroek)

Rugby sevens

Canada qualified a girls' team of twelve athletes after winning the North American qualification event in Las Vegas in March 2018. Canada's 12 women roster was named on August 29, 2018.

Girls' tournament

Roster

Delaney Aikens
Taylor Black
Kendra Cousineau
Hunter Czeppel
Olivia De Couvreur
Brooklynn Feasby
Lizzie Gibson 
Madison Grant
Carmen Izyk
Aleisha Lewis
Maggie Mackinnon
Keyara Wardley

Pool A

Bronze medal match

Shooting

Canada qualified one sport shooter based on its performance at the American Qualification Tournament.

Individual

Team

Sport climbing

Canada received a reallocated quota to send a girl.

 Girls' combined - 1 quota (Cat Carkner)

Swimming

Canada's swimming team of eight athletes (four per gender) was announced on April 9, 2018. Canada qualified a full quota of eight athletes. However, changes were made which removed gold medal favourites Gabe Mastromatteo and Margaret MacNeil, along with Alexander Pratt off the team. They were removed and replaced, because they were not available for the games.

Boys

Girls

Mixed relays

Taekwondo

Canada qualified one boy at the qualification event in April 2018 in Tunisia.

Boys

Triathlon

Canada qualified one athlete based on its performance at the 2018 American Youth Olympic Games Qualifier.

Individual

Relay

Wrestling

Canada received two reallocated quota spots (one boy and one girl).

Boys

See also
Canada at the 2018 Winter Olympics
Canada at the 2018 Winter Paralympics
Canada at the 2018 Commonwealth Games

References

2018 in Canadian sports
Nations at the 2018 Summer Youth Olympics
Canada at the Youth Olympics